Robert G. Woll (January 30, 1911 – August 29, 1999) was an American football player, coach of football, basketball, and baseball, and college athletics administrator.  After lettering for three years in football, basketball and baseball at Monmouth College, Woll served there as a teacher, coach, and finally athletic director until his death in 1999.

The football field at Monmouth College is named for Woll.

Head coaching record

Football

References

External links
 

1911 births
1999 deaths
American men's basketball players
Basketball coaches from Illinois
Basketball players from Illinois
Monmouth Fighting Scots athletic directors
Monmouth Fighting Scots baseball coaches
Monmouth Fighting Scots baseball players
Monmouth Fighting Scots football coaches
Monmouth Fighting Scots football players
Monmouth Fighting Scots men's basketball coaches
Monmouth Fighting Scots men's basketball players
People from Jackson County, Illinois